Craig Michael House (born July 8, 1977) is a former Major League Baseball pitcher who played for the Colorado Rockies in 2000. 

A native of Okinawa, Japan, House attended the University of Memphis. In 1998, he played collegiate summer baseball with the Wareham Gatemen of the Cape Cod Baseball League. House was drafted by the Colorado Rockies in the 12th round of the 1999 Major League Baseball draft. He made his debut on August 8, with the Rockies. 

House pitched in 16 games for Colorado in 2000, his only major league season, posting one win, with one loss, and a 7.24 ERA. He was part of a three-team trade in January  involving the Rockies, New York Mets, and Milwaukee Brewers, and was selected off waivers by the Los Angeles Dodgers in February, but was released at the end of the year. After not catching on with the Seattle Mariners, Florida Marlins, Baltimore Orioles, or Texas Rangers, he retired after .

References

External links

1977 births
Albuquerque Isotopes players
American baseball players
American expatriate baseball players in Canada
American expatriate baseball players in Japan
Bowie Baysox players
Carolina Mudcats players
Colorado Rockies players
Colorado Springs Sky Sox players
Frederick Keys players
Jacksonville Suns players
Las Vegas 51s players
Living people
Major League Baseball pitchers
Major League Baseball players from Japan
Memphis Tigers baseball players
Oklahoma RedHawks players
Ottawa Lynx players
People from Okinawa Prefecture
San Antonio Missions players
Tacoma Rainiers players
Wareham Gatemen players